Ephestiasula is a genus of praying mantises belonging to the family Hymenopodidae. The species of this genus are found in India. 

Species:

Ephestiasula obscura 
Ephestiasula rogenhoferi 
Ephestiasula woodmasoni

References

Mantodea genera
Hymenopodidae